David Andrew Cochrane (14 August 1920 – June 2000) was an Ireland international footballer who played in the Football League for Leeds United.

References

Association footballers from Northern Ireland
English Football League players
1920 births
2000 deaths
Leeds United F.C. players
Northern Ireland international footballers
Association football wingers